Ceratophyllus enefdeae is a species of flea in the family Ceratophyllidae. It was described by Ioff in 1950.

References 

Ceratophyllidae
Insects described in 1950